The Queensway (or Queensway) is a major street in the municipalities of Toronto and Mississauga, Ontario, Canada. It is a western  continuation of Queen Street, after it crosses Roncesvalles Avenue and King Street in Toronto. The Queensway is a divided roadway from Roncevalles westerly until 600 metres of the South Kingsway (accessed by ramps) with its centre median dedicated to streetcar service. The road continues undivided west from there  to Etobicoke Creek as a four- or six-lane thoroughfare.

After crossing the creek, it enters Mississauga under Peel Region jurisdiction as Peel Regional Road 20, as far west as Mavis Road, with the westernmost portion to Glengarry Road being maintained by the city. There is a road allowance with hydro lines, cutting into the Mississaugua Golf & Country Club on the shores of the Credit River. In the 1990s, the name Queensway was eliminated on the roads on this allowance west of the river. The street gives its name to Etobicoke's the Queensway neighbourhood.

Etymology 

The Queensway in Toronto was once named Queen Street and was officially the western part of the street in Old Toronto. There were three separate portions: the easternmost being a stub of the main section of Queen that continued west of Roncesvalles Avenue to Colborne Lodge Drive; a central section separated from it by a swampy area south of Grenadier Pond in High Park, running west of Ellis Avenue; and the westernmost running through the former Etobicoke west of the Humber River. The section west of the Humber was named the Queensway in 1947 to avoid confusion due to the break, but the name "Queen Street" was not restored after the present Queensway was completed to connect the sections of the formerly broken street. The most likely reason for this was because the Borough of Etobicoke desired a counterpart, the Kingsway.

In Mississauga, the road is simply named "Queensway", with east and west designations on either side of Hurontario Street: Queensway East and Queensway West
 
From 1953 to 1954, the Queensway was signed briefly as Ontario Highway 108 when it was under the-then Department of Highways from Highway 27 (prior to being renamed Highway 427) and the eastern end of the Queen Elizabeth Way.

For Highway 427's southbound express and collector carriageways, overhead exit signs formerly showed the Queensway as "Queensway Avenue", while present signs use the proper designation. It is unclear as to why the older signs used Queensway Avenue, but it was likely to avoid confusion with adjacent exit signs for the parallel Queen Elizabeth Way (QEW) at the last collector-to-express transfer (and vice-versa), as after that point, the collector lanes had an off-ramp to the Queensway but no direct access to the QEW (with the express lanes being the opposite). In 2001, the collector lanes received a ramp to access the eastern QEW; nonetheless, there was no longer any need for the Queensway Avenue signage as the eastern QEW was re-designated the Gardiner Expressway as a result of 1998 provincial downloading. The old Queensway Avenue signage was still present mixed with the proper signs for a time after the downloading.

History
What would become the Queensway in Mississauga was formerly the Upper Middle Road (or the 1st Concession South of Dundas Street).

  
The section between Roncesvalles and the Humber River was built in the 1950s, in conjunction with the construction of the Gardiner Expressway. The Queensway was built before the Gardiner Expressway to provide an east–west route for traffic while Lake Shore Boulevard was rerouted to accommodate the Gardiner. The project cost $4.9 million. The project included a streetcar right-of-way in the middle of the Queensway from Parkside Drive to the Humber River.

The section from the Humber River west predates the High Park section and was previously known as Stock's Side Road, and then Queen Street. It originally spurred off Lake Shore Boulevard (then known as Lake Shore Road) at the Humber River, but that connection was severed with the building of the Queen Elizabeth Way.

To build the Parkside Drive to Ellis Drive section, the Metro government bought  of High Park from the city. This was in contravention of stipulations by original High Park owner John Howard that the lands be used for parkland only. Metro officials searched for descendants of Howard to obtain their consent.

During the post-2000 period, the Queensway has been subject to new condominium development, particularly in the vicinity of the Humber River. An attraction to this development is the proximity to downtown streetcar service.

Streetcar right-of-way

The streetcar right-of-way (ROW) along the Queensway opened on July 20, 1957, together with the new Humber Loop. Construction of the Gardiner Expressway had forced the abandonment of streetcar tracks along Lake Shore Boulevard between Sunnyside and the Humber River. From the intersection of King Street, the Queensway, Queen Street and Roncesvalles Avenue (KQQR), streetcars run in mixed traffic passing the Sunnyside Loop to about Claude Avenue where the ROW begins. The ROW goes westwards, crosses the Humber River and then turns into Humber Loop.

On January 8, 2017, the ROW was closed in order to reconstruct the Queensway Bridge, carrying streetcar tracks over the Humber River, and to replace streetcar tracks and overhead wire on the ROW and at Humber Loop. Streetcar service resumed to South Kingsway (with streetcars continuing without passengers to turn at Humber Loop) on April 1, 2018, and to Humber loop with passengers on June 24, 2018.

On March 31, 2021, the KQQR intersection closed for track replacement and a redesign of the intersection. As a result, buses replaced streetcar service along the Queensway. (The KQQR intersection is expected to reopen for 501 Queen streetcars on September 3, 2022, and for 504 King streetcars by the end of December 2022.) As part of the construction project, the ROW on the Queensway will be extended from Claude Avenue to Roncesvalles Avenue. At Sunnyside Avenue, traffic signals will be added to facilitate streetcar movements from the Sunnyside Loop. At Glendale Avenue, the westbound near-side platform will be relocated to the far side, and both the westbound and the far-side eastbound platforms will be widened for accessibility. Transit priority signals will be installed at Glendale Avenue, Sunnyside Avenue, and Roncesvalles Avenue. At KQQR, the eastbound platform on the Queensway will be replaced with a far-side platform on Queen Street, the new platform being similar to the "bumpouts" along Roncesvalles Avenue.

At its west end, the ROW passes through Humber Loop running in a tunnel under the Gardiner Expressway to end in mixed traffic on Lake Shore Boulevard. In November 2017, the TTC issued a report recommending that the ROW be extended along Lake Shore Boulevard from the tunnel to Park Lawn Road, where a new Park Lawn Loop would be constructed. At that time, the TTC considered this to be a high-priority project. Extending the ROW further west was considered unjustified given projected ridership.

The Queensway right-of-way is currently used by the 501 Queen, with the 508 Lake Shore originally operating on it but later being put on hold due to COVID-19 pandemic–related cuts. The 80 Queensway operates west of Humber loop to the West Mall.

Nearby landmarks
From east to west:

Toronto
 Roncesvalles Carhouse, TTC streetcar facility
 St. Joseph's Health Centre
 High Park
 Ontario Food Terminal
 Palace Pier Park
 Humber Bay Park
 Church on the Queensway (formerly named Queensway Cathedral), a Pentecostal megachurch
 Queensway Health Centre
 Sherway Gardens

Mississauga
 Mississauga Hospital
 Huron Park Recreation Centre (north off of the Queensway)
 Credit Valley Golf and Country Club

References

External links
 , short documentary about the Parkside Drive streetcar stop along the Queensway

Roads in Toronto
Roads in Mississauga
Peel Regional Roads